A partial solar eclipse will occur on December 6, 2086. A solar eclipse occurs when the Moon passes between Earth and the Sun, thereby totally or partly obscuring the image of the Sun for a viewer on Earth. A partial solar eclipse occurs in the polar regions of the Earth when the center of the Moon's shadow misses the Earth.

The antumbral (annular) shadow of the moon will pass just above the north pole of the earth.

Related eclipses

Solar eclipses 2083–2087

Metonic series 
 All eclipses in this table occur at the Moon's ascending node.

References

External links 

2086 12 6
2086 12 6
2086 12 6
2086 in science